Supervivientes 2018: Perdidos en Honduras, is the thirteenth season of the show Supervivientes and the seventeenth season of Survivor to air in Spain and it will be broadcast on Telecinco in spring 2018. Jorge Javier Vázquez will be the main host at the central studio in Madrid, with Lara Álvarez co-hosting from the island and Sandra Barneda hosting a side debate of the program. The crew fled to Honduras on March 8. Ultimately, it was Sofía Suescun who won this season over Logan Sampedro and Raquel Mosquera.

Cast
The first contestant announced was María Lapiedra, who was announced the previous season when she visited the island as a guest.
The second contestant announced was Raquel Mosquera on February 21 during Sálvame Diario.
On February 24, Mayte Zaldívar was confirmed as the third contestant during Sábado Deluxe.
On February 26, Francisco was confirmed as the fourth contestant.
The fifth contestant announced was Adrián Rodríguez on February 28 during Got Talent.
On March 2, Saray Montoya was announced as the sixth contestant during Cámbiame.
On March 3, Isabel Castell was confirmed as the seventh contestant during Sábado Deluxe.
The eight contestant announced was Maestro Joao on March 4 during Viva la Vida.
The ninth contestant announced was Sofía Suescun on March 5 during MyHyV.
On March 6, Sergio Carvajal was confirmed as the tenth contestant.
On March 8, Melissa Vargas was confirmed as the eleventh contestant in the radio show Morning Glory.
The twelfth and thirteenth contestants announced were Fernando Marcos and Alberto Isla on March 9 during El programa de Ana Rosa y Sálvame Diario respectively.
On March 10, María Jesús Ruiz was confirmed as the fourteenth contestant during Viva la Vida.
On March 11, the last two contestants announced were Romina Malaspina and Daniel Sampedro 'Logan'. Hugo Paz entered on Week 5 as a replacement because of the low number of contestants still on the game, due to the quittings and ejections that happened in the early weeks.

Nominations

Notes

: As the leaders of the teams, Joao and Logan were given the power to name a nominee.
: Melissa was fake evicted and was sent to the Lookout zone.
: Logan and Alberto swapped teams on week 2.
: As the leaders of the teams, Fernando and María were given the power to name a nominee.
: Mayte was fake evicted and was sent to the Lookout zone.
: As the leaders of the teams, Logan and Sergio were given the power to name a nominee.
: María was fake evicted and was sent to the Lookout zone.
: As the leaders of the teams, Francisco and Raquel were given the power to name a nominee.
: Romina was automatically nominated due to her bad behaviour.
: Fernando was fake evicted and was sent to the Lookout zone.
: As the leaders of the teams, Hugo and Logan were given the power to name a nominee.
: María Jesús left the island on Day 30 due to judicial reasons, but she returned five days later on Day 35.
: María Jesús was fake evicted and was sent to the Lookout zone.
: After the eviction of Mayte, María Jesús and Melissa survived and returned as official tribemates and then, all contestants were split in two new groups decided by the public.
: As the leaders of the teams, Logan and Romina were given the power to name a nominee.
: There was a tie between Francisco and María Jesús and Romina, as leader, broke it nominating Francisco.
: Raquel was exempt from nominations as she was being attending by doctors due to medical reasons.
: From this round of nominations, the Judas Kiss twist was introduced and the evicted contestant could nominate a member of its team.
: As the leaders of the teams, Romina and Sergio were given the power to name a nominee.
: Due to a complot to intentionally nominate Mª Jesús as a group, the program decided to nominate all the members of the tribe except the leader.
: As the leaders of the teams, Francisco and Hugo were given the power to name a nominee.
: There was a tie between Raquel and Sergio and Hugo, as leader, broke it nominating Raquel.
: Logan and Sergio were automatically nominated for breaking the rules.
: As the winner of the immunity challenge, Sofía was given the power to name a nominee.
: There was a tie between Mª Jesús and Romina and Sofía, as leader, broke it nominating Romina.
: Sofía found a hidden nomination idol and she could automatically nominate a contestant. She nominated Logan.
: As the winner of the immunity challenge, Sergio was given the power to name a nominee.
: There was a tie between Mª Jesús and Sofía and Sergio, as leader, broke it nominating Sofía.
: As the winner of the immunity challenge, Logan was given the power to name a nominee.
: There was a tie between Raquel and Sofía and Logan, as leader, broke it nominating Raquel.
: Mª Jesús received 3 extra points in the nominations in a task, however, because of her eviction, her Judas Kiss counted as 3 points.
: As the winner of the immunity challenge, Sergio was given the power to name a nominee.
: Logan and Sofía were the contestants who played the immunity challenge, however, due to the hardness of the challenge they were named both leaders and therefore immune from nominations.
: As Logan and Sofía were leaders, only Raquel and Sergio could be nominated.
: Logan won the last immunity challenge and went through the final vote. Raquel and Sofía were nominated.

Tribes

Ratings

"Galas"

"Conexión Honduras"

"Tierra de Nadie"

"Última Hora / Camino a la final / Cuentas pendientes"

References

External links
 

Survivor Spain seasons
2018 Spanish television seasons